David Twersky may refer to:

David Twersky (journalist) (1950–2010), journalist, Zionist activist, and peace advocate in Israel and the United States
David Twersky (Skverer Rebbe) (born 1940), Grand Rabbi and spiritual leader of the village of New Square, New York